The Republic Newspaper Office is a modernist building in Columbus, Indiana that was originally home to the local newspaper The Republic.  Completed in 1971, it is an acknowledged masterpiece of Modern architect Myron Goldsmith, and was designated a National Historic Landmark for its architecture in 2012.

History 
The Republic building was completed in 1971 by Myron Goldsmith of Skidmore, Owings & Merrill as the first of their 1960 masterplan for the city of Columbus. The one storey structure was constructed with a steel and aluminum frame on a low concrete foundation. The building's glass exterior originally allowed the newspaper's bright yellow printing press to be viewed from the nearby street.  Its landscaping, part of the original design, includes lawn extending directly to the building's foundation (with no foundation plantings), and honey locust trees carefully planted to align and interplay with the building's bays.

The printing press was removed from the building and all printing functions were moved off site in 1997. In 2016, the newspaper relocated.

In 2016 the building was purchased by Southeastern Indiana Medical Holdings for $2.8 million for use as an administrative office. 

The IU Foundation Inc of Indiana University purchased the building from Southeastern Indiana Medical Holdings in 2018 for $2.8 million. The building is intended to house the university's new Master of Architecture program.

In popular culture 
The building was featured throughout the 2017 film Columbus.

Historical designation 
In 2012, the site was designated a National Historic Landmark on the basis of its architecture, making it the seventh structure in Columbus to receive the title.

References 

Buildings and structures in Columbus, Indiana
Modernist architecture in Indiana
National Historic Landmarks in Columbus, Indiana
Commercial buildings completed in 1971